Stickley House may refer to:

Stickley House (Madisonville, Tennessee), listed on the National Register of Historic Places in Monroe County, Tennessee
Gustav Stickley House, Syracuse, New York, listed on the NRHP in Onondaga County, New York

See also 
 Craftsman Farms, New Jersey, built by Gustav Stickley